Illerrieden is a town in the district of Alb-Donau in Baden-Württemberg in Germany. The city has 3,305 inhabitants and spans 18.17km squared, with an average density of 181.89 inhabitants per km squared. The city can be reached by the A7 motorway and is an hour away from Munich by car. 

Jens Kaiser (CDU) is the current mayor of Illerrieden, re-elected in 2020.

Alb-Donau has a tourism website for information and activities in Illerrieden.

Mayors

References

Alb-Donau-Kreis
Württemberg